Ziarat Kaka Sahib is a town in the Khyber Pakhtunkhwa province of Pakistan. It is named after a sufi saint Kaka Sahib

On 22 January 2020, a seven-year-old girl was found dead in a water tank in the Ziarat Kaka Sahib town of Nowshera district.

Buildings
The shrine of 16th century's most popular Sufi saint Kaka Sahib is located in a rugged mountainous area around 12 km south of Nowshera district. It is considered as one of the most frequently visited religious heritage sites in Khyber Pakhtunkhwa.

Notable people
Uzair Gul
Adnan Kakakhail

References

Populated places in Khyber Pakhtunkhwa